Rear-Admiral Edward William Ellis CB, CBE (6 September 1918 – 13 January 2002) was a Royal Navy officer who became President of the Royal Naval College, Greenwich.

Naval career
Ellis joined the Royal Navy in 1940 and served in World War II in the destroyer HMS Broadwater and then in the destroyer HMS Eclipse. He became Secretary to the Fourth Sea Lord in 1956, Secretary to the Commander-in-Chief, South Atlantic and South America in 1959 and Head of the Commander-in-Chief's South-East Secretariat in 1963. He went on to be Secretary to Commander-in-Chief, Portsmouth in 1965 and Secretary to the First Sea Lord in 1966. Appointed CBE in May 1968, his last appointments were as Commodore Royal Naval Barracks Portsmouth in 1968 and President of the Royal Naval College, Greenwich in 1972 before retiring in 1974.

References

1918 births
2002 deaths
Royal Navy rear admirals
Commanders of the Order of the British Empire
Companions of the Order of the Bath
Admiral presidents of the Royal Naval College, Greenwich
Royal Navy officers of World War II